Sphingopyxis panaciterrulae is a bacterium. It is gram-negative, rod-shaped and motile. Its type strain is DCY34T (=KCTC 22112T =JCM 14844T).

References

External links 
LPSN

Type strain of Sphingopyxis panaciterrulae at BacDive -  the Bacterial Diversity Metadatabase

Sphingomonadales
Bacteria described in 2009